Abraham Anthony Farm is a historic farm and national historic district located near Blackburn, Catawba County, North Carolina. The district encompasses 13 contributing buildings, 1 contributing site, and 2 contributing structures. The main house was built in 1877, and is a two-story, brick, late Greek Revival style farmhouse.  Also on the property is a collection of brick, log, frame and concrete outbuildings and a log cabin.

It was added to the National Register of Historic Places in 1990.

References

Farms on the National Register of Historic Places in North Carolina
Historic districts on the National Register of Historic Places in North Carolina
Greek Revival houses in North Carolina
Houses completed in 1877
Houses in Catawba County, North Carolina
National Register of Historic Places in Catawba County, North Carolina
1877 establishments in North Carolina